Jingmen–Shashi railway or Jingsha railway, is a single-track regional railroad in Hubei Province of central China between Jingmen and Shashi District of Jingzhou. It opened in May 1989. The line runs from Shashi on the Yangtze River north to Jingmen and is used to carry freight, including coal and iron ore. The line's five stations are Jingmen South, Tuanlin, Shayang, Jingzhou North and Shashi.

Rail connections
 Jingmen: Jiaozuo–Liuzhou railway

See also

 List of railways in China

References

Railway lines in China
Rail transport in Hubei
Railway lines opened in 1989